The Usambara thrush (Turdus roehli), also known as Roehl's thrush or Usambara olive thrush, is a species of thrush found in  eastern Africa. Formerly, it was considered as a subspecies of the olive thrush, with which it is known to hybridize with, but is now recognised as a separate species.

Description
This medium-sized bird has a length of about 24 cm. It has a wing length between 117 and 131 mm, a culmen length between 20 and 24 mm and a tarsus length between 30,0 and 34,5 mm. It can reach a mass of at least 86 g. It occurs in the Pare and Usambara mountains of north-central Tanzania.

References

Usambara thrush
Endemic birds of Tanzania
Birds described in 1905